University City station may refer to:

 University City–Big Bend station, a St. Louis MetroLink subway station in Greater St. Louis, Missouri
 University City Blvd station, a light rail station in Charlotte, North Carolina
 Penn Medicine station (formerly University City station), a train station in the University City section of Philadelphia, Pennsylvania

See also
 University station (disambiguation)